Chief architect may refer to:

Architecture
Chief Dominion Architect
Chief Government Architect of the Netherlands
Software architect

See also
Chief Architect Software
State architect